Robert Taylor (before 1660 — March 1696) was an Irish Member of Parliament.

Biography
He sat in the Irish House of Commons for Askeaton in the parliaments of 1692 and 1695. On his death he was succeeded by Chichester Phillips. His sons Berkeley and Robert also sat for the borough.

References

1696 deaths
Irish MPs 1692–1693
Irish MPs 1695–1699
Members of the Parliament of Ireland (pre-1801) for County Limerick constituencies
Year of birth uncertain